Jan Mashiani  was a South African track and field athlete who competed in the 1904 Summer Olympics in the marathon. He finished thirteenth of the fourteen finishers, but moved up to twelfth after Frederick Lorz was disqualified.

See also 
 South Africa at the 1904 Summer Olympics

References

Sources

External links

South African male marathon runners
Olympic athletes of South Africa
Athletes (track and field) at the 1904 Summer Olympics
Year of birth missing
Year of death missing